Walter Herron Taylor III (July 5, 1872 – August 1, 1960) was an American football coach.  He was the first head football coach at the Virginia Military Institute (VMI) in Lexington, Virginia, serving for the 1891 season and compiling a record of 3–0–1. Taylor was the son of banker, lawyer, soldier, politician, author, and railroad executive Walter H. Taylor, who was also an aide-de-camp to Robert E. Lee.

VMI did compete in one football game in 1873, but no records were kept on the coach.  The one-game season was a loss to Washington and Lee.

Head coaching record

References

External links
 

1872 births
1960 deaths
American football fullbacks
19th-century players of American football
VMI Keydets football coaches
VMI Keydets football players
Players of American football from Norfolk, Virginia
Sportspeople from Norfolk, Virginia